Kappa Delta Epsilon is a professional fraternity for students in Education. It was organized on March 25, 1933.

History
On , at the invitation of the Executive Council of Kappa Phi Kappa, professional educational fraternity representatives from six institutions met in Washington, DC and formed a national honorary professional education organization for women. The movement was sponsored by the following National Officers of Kappa Phi Kappa: Dean Will Grant Chambers of Pennsylvania State College, Professor Fredrick Henke of Allegheny College, and Dr. Arthur Wright; all National Officers of Kappa Phi Kappa fraternity.

The founding delegates for the new professional women's society were:
Mrs. Mina French Mosher, Allegheny College
Dr. Eoline Wallace Moore, Birmingham–Southern College
Mrs. Olive Miller Ellis, Cornell University
Miss Dorothy Orr, and Mrs. Claudius Layton Taylor, Emory University
Miss Mary D. Webb, Illinois State University
Mrs. Sylvia Levitt Ostrow, and Mrs. W. W. Cottman, Temple University

The Organization, then called a sorority, was incorporated under the laws of Georgia in August 1935.

Magazine
 1935 - The first issue of the magazine of the sorority, THE CIRCLE OF KAPPA DELTA EPSILON, was edited by the National Secretary Miss Mary D. Webb.
 1936 - A policy of having THE CIRCLE published by the various chapters on a rotating basis was begun. Cornell Chapter initiated the policy.
 1947 - At the National Convention at Gettysburg, THE CIRCLE was replaced by THE KAPPA DELTA EPSILON CURRENT

Chapters 
Chapters include the following. Active undergraduate or alumni chapters are listed in bold, inactive chapters are listed in italics.

References

External links 
 

Student organizations established in 1933
Student societies in the United States
Professional fraternities and sororities in the United States
Former members of Professional Fraternity Association
1933 establishments in Washington, D.C.